Manuel Panini (born 5 August 1983) is an Italian footballer who plays for Flaminia.

Biography
Born in Marino, suburb of Rome, Panini started his career in Lazio team Frosinone. He followed team promoted to Serie C2 in 2001. In 2002, he returned to Serie D for Cavese. Cavese signed him in co-ownership deal in January 2004. In June Cavese signed him outright. He did not play in the whole 2005–06 Serie C2.

In 2006, he joined Serie A club Catania. On 6 July he left for Taranto. On 5 July 2007 he was signed by Foggia, along with Gianvito Plasmati. In January 2008 he left for Juve Stabia.

In January 2009 he terminated his contract with Catania and signed by Aversa Normanna.

On 15 September 2009 he joined Paganese. His contract was renewed on 19 August 2010.

On 17 June 2019, Panini joined Flaminia.

Honours
 Serie D: 2003 (Cavese)

References

External links
 AIC.Football.it Profile 
 

Italian footballers
Frosinone Calcio players
Taranto F.C. 1927 players
Calcio Foggia 1920 players
S.S. Juve Stabia players
Paganese Calcio 1926 players
Cavese 1919 players
Catania S.S.D. players
Serie C players
Serie D players
Association football defenders
Sportspeople from the Metropolitan City of Rome Capital
1983 births
Living people
S.F. Aversa Normanna players
U.S. Agropoli 1921 players
Footballers from Lazio